Wibble may refer to:

 Anne Wibble (1943–2000), former Swedish minister of finance 
 A commonly used metasyntactic variable, alongside wubble and wobble
 Wibbles, a poi trick in juggling